John James Monckton (28 October 1938 – 29 June 2017) was an Australian backstroke swimmer who won a silver medal in the 100-metre event at the 1956 Summer Olympics in Melbourne.  Although he set multiple world records, he never won an Olympic gold medal.

An apprentice carpenter from the New England region of New South Wales, Monckton appeared to be primed to win gold at the 1956 Olympics.  At the national team camp in Townsville before the games, he became the first person to swim 400-metre backstroke in under five minutes. Although it was not a regularly contested event at international level, it was a promising sign for the event to be included for medal competition in the Olympics. He also set world records in the 110- and 220-yard freestyle events.

At the Olympics, Monckton was the fastest qualifier in the heats and semifinal, but was upstaged in the final by teammate David Theile.

In the absence of Theile, who had retired after the Olympics to study medicine at university, Monckton dominated backstroke swimming, winning the 110-yard backstroke event at the 1958 British Empire and Commonwealth Games in Cardiff and also the 4×110-yard medley relay. Monckton then prepared for another Olympics in 1960 in Rome, with Theile deferring his studies to defend his Olympic title. Monckton again led the qualifying in the heats and semifinals.  However, in the final, he misjudged the turn and broke a finger. He limped home in seventh position, with Theile successfully defending his title.  Monckton continued competing in the hope of reaching a third Olympics in 1964, but retired after his performances began to deteriorate.

He married Maureen Giles, an Australian swimmer at the 1956 Olympics.

He was inducted into the Sport Australia Hall of Fame in 1999.

The Monckton Aquatic Centre in his hometown of Armidale is named for him.

See also
 List of Olympic medalists in swimming (men)
 List of Commonwealth Games medallists in swimming (men)
 World record progression 100 metres backstroke
 World record progression 200 metres backstroke

References

Bibliography
 

1938 births
2017 deaths
Australian male backstroke swimmers
Sportsmen from New South Wales
Swimmers at the 1956 Summer Olympics
Swimmers at the 1960 Summer Olympics
Olympic swimmers of Australia
Olympic silver medalists for Australia
Sport Australia Hall of Fame inductees
Commonwealth Games gold medallists for Australia
World record setters in swimming
Medalists at the 1956 Summer Olympics
Olympic silver medalists in swimming
Swimmers at the 1958 British Empire and Commonwealth Games
Commonwealth Games medallists in swimming
20th-century Australian people
Medallists at the 1958 British Empire and Commonwealth Games